Wolf 1061b is an exoplanet orbiting the red dwarf star Wolf 1061 in the Ophiuchus constellation, about 13.8 light years from  Earth. It is the first planet in order from its host star in a triple planetary system, and has an orbital period of nearly 5 days. The planet orbits too close to its star for it to be in the habitable zone.

See also
 List of exoplanets

References

External links
Simulated view of the Wolf 1061 system. Video created by the University of New South Wales

Wolf 1061
Exoplanets discovered in 2015
Near-Earth-sized exoplanets
Ophiuchus (constellation)
Exoplanets detected by radial velocity